Johanne Guillou is a Martiniquais footballer who plays as a defender for the Martinique women's national team.

International career
Guillou capped for Martinique at senior level during the 2014 CONCACAF Women's Championship.

References

External links 
 

Living people
Martiniquais women's footballers
Women's association football defenders
Martinique women's international footballers
Year of birth missing (living people)